The Siberian Tiger Park is a zoological park in Harbin, Heilongjiang, Northeast China. It hosts, amongst other animals, the Siberian tiger.

See also 
 Siberian Tiger Introduction Project

References 

Zoos in China
Tourist attractions in Harbin
Parks in Heilongjiang